May 23 - Eastern Orthodox Church calendar - May 25

All fixed commemorations below celebrated on June 6 by Orthodox Churches on the Old Calendar.

For May 24th, Orthodox Churches on the Old Calendar commemorate the Saints listed on May 11.

Saints
 Martyrs Meletius Stratelates, Stephen, John, and 1218 soldiers with women and children, including:
 Serapion the Egyptian, Callinicus the former Magician, Theodore, Faustus, the women Marciana, Susanna, and Palladia, two children Cyriacus and Christian; and  
 Twelve tribunes: Faustus, Festus, Marcellus, Theodore, Meletius, Sergius, Marcellinus, Felix, Photinus, Theodoriscus, Mercurius, and Didymus — all of whom suffered in Galatia (c.138-161)
 Venerable Symeon Stylites the Younger of Wonderful Mountain (c.592)
 Saint Kyriakos of Evrychou, in Cyprus, the Wonderworker.
 Nun-martyr Martha, abbess of Monemvasia (990)

Pre-Schism Western saints
 Martyrs Donatian and Rogatian, brothers (299)
 Martyr Afra (304)
 Martyr Robustian, at Milan.
 Martyr Vincent of Porto.
 Martyrs Zöellus, Servilius, Felix, Silvanus, and Diocles, in Istria.
 Saint Patrice (Patrick), fourth Bishop of Bayeux in France (c.469)
 Saint Elpidios (Elpidius), Bishop of Aversa, in Campania southern Italy (5th century)
 Saint Vincent of Lerins (445)

Post-Schism Orthodox saints
 Venerable Nikita Stylites, Wonderworker of Pereyaslavl-Zalesski (1186) 
 Saint Gregory of Novgorod, Archbishop (1193)

Other commemorations
 Translation of the relics (c.1067) of St. George of the Holy Mountain and Georgia (1065)
 Repose of Monk Cyriacus of Valaam (1818)
 Repose of Blessed Amphilochius of Rostov (1824)
 Glorification (1988) of Saint Xenia of Petersburg, fool-for-Christ (c.1803) 
 Inauguration of the church of Virgin Mary in Karrais (Al Kara) of Syria

Icon gallery

Notes

References

Sources 
 May 24/June 6. Orthodox Calendar (PRAVOSLAVIE.RU).
 June 6 / May 24. HOLY TRINITY RUSSIAN ORTHODOX CHURCH (A parish of the Patriarchate of Moscow).
 Complete List of Saints. Protection of the Mother of God Church (POMOG).
 May 24. OCA - The Lives of the Saints.
 May 24. The Roman Martyrology.
 May 24. Latin Saints of the Orthodox Patriarchate of Rome.
Greek Sources
 Great Synaxaristes:  24 ΜΑΪΟΥ. ΜΕΓΑΣ ΣΥΝΑΞΑΡΙΣΤΗΣ.
  Συναξαριστής. 24 Μαΐου. ECCLESIA.GR. (H ΕΚΚΛΗΣΙΑ ΤΗΣ ΕΛΛΑΔΟΣ). 
Russian Sources
  6 июня (24 мая). Православная Энциклопедия под редакцией Патриарха Московского и всея Руси Кирилла (электронная версия). (Orthodox Encyclopedia - Pravenc.ru).
  24 мая (ст.ст.) 6 июня 2013 (нов. ст.). Русская Православная Церковь Отдел внешних церковных связей. (DECR).

May in the Eastern Orthodox calendar